Annin tofu or xingren tofu, sometimes translated as almond tofu, is a soft, jellied dessert made of apricot kernel milk, agar, and sugar. It is a traditional dessert of Chinese cuisine and Japanese cuisine. A similar dessert is blancmange.

The name "tofu" here refers to "tofu-like solid"; soy beans, which are the main ingredient of tofu, are not used. This naming convention is also seen in other East Asian dishes, such as Chinese  and Japanese . Apricot kernel milk is often confused with almond milk, as apricot kernel itself is often confused with almond.

Traditional recipe

In the traditional recipe, the primary flavoring agent is apricot kernels, soaked and ground with water. The mixture is strained, sweetened, and heated with a gelling agent (usually agar). When chilled, the apricot kernel milk mixture solidifies into the consistency of a soft gelatin dessert.

Variations
Although the agar-based recipe is vegan, there are numerous nontraditional recipes that are not. Most are based on dairy products and a small amount of flavored extract. Gelatin is also a common substitute for agar.

Annin jelly can be made from scratch or using instant mix. There is an instant soy-based powder with a coagulating agent, which dissolves in hot water and solidifies upon cooling.

See also
 Crème caramel  
 List of Chinese desserts
 List of desserts

References

External links

Annin tofu recipe

Chinese desserts
Beijing cuisine
Cantonese cuisine
Dim sum
Hong Kong cuisine
Puddings
Jams and jellies
Almond desserts